Uspenka is a rural locality (a village) in Krasnokurtovsky Selsoviet, Arkhangelsky District, Bashkortostan, Russia. The population was 87 as of 2010. There are 3 streets.

Geography 
Uspenka is located 34 km north of Arkhangelskoye (the district's administrative centre) by road. Troitskoye is the nearest rural locality.

References 

Rural localities in Arkhangelsky District